WERR (104.1 FM), branded on-air as 104.1 FM Redentor, is a radio station broadcasting a Contemporary Christian format. Licensed to Vega Alta, Puerto Rico, it serves the Puerto Rico area. and is currently owned by WERR Radio Redentor, Inc. The station is the first Christian radio station in Puerto Rico.

The station is relayed through booster stations, WERR-FM1 in Caguas and WERR-FM2 in Yauco, and WERR-FM3 in Mayaguez three of them operating at 104.1 FM. The station also rebroadcasts on WZIN (104.3 FM) in Charlotte Amalie, covering the U.S. Virgin Islands.

Logos

External links

Contemporary Christian radio stations in Puerto Rico
Radio stations established in 1970
1970 establishments in Puerto Rico
Vega Alta, Puerto Rico